Shaun Micallef's On The Sauce is an Australian television factual three-episode documentary series, about drinking alcohol, on ABC, starring comedian and writer Shaun Micallef.

Shaun Micallef, a former binge-drinker, at university, journeys around the nation to look at Australia's drinking culture. He is confronted by the highs and lows of alcohol consumption and the changing shape of Australia's national pastime. Micallef, with his sons approaching drinking age, considers what to advise them about alcohol. Later, in tears, says he lost his sister-in law to alcoholism complications, weeks before filming.

Reception 
Shaun Micallef’s On the Sauce was the highest-viewed, Screen Australia–supported, television documentary during 2020—2021, with 985,000 viewers.

Shaun Micallef’s On the Sauce was an Australian Teachers of Media Finalist, Best Factual Television Series.

References

External links
 
 

2020 Australian television series debuts
Australian Broadcasting Corporation original programming
Australian comedy television series